Velizar Dimitrov (born 13 April 1979) is a former Bulgarian professional footballer who played as a midfielder.

He has previously played for Minyor Pernik,  Lokomotiv Sofia, Marek Dupnitsa and CSKA Sofia. Dimitrov was part of the Bulgarian 2004 European Football Championship team, who exited in the first round, finishing bottom of Group C, having finished top of Qualifying Group 8 in the pre-tournament phase. He has also worked as a pundit since his retirement.

Career
He joined CSKA Sofia in 2002, brought in the team by the manager Stoycho Mladenov..

In 2003, when Dimitrov won a number of individual awards as one of the best players in the A PFG, he was close to securing a move to FC Porto, but the deal eventually fell through due to financial reasons.

Metalurh Donetsk 
On 11 June 2008, Dimitrov signed with Metalurh Donetsk on a 2+1-year deal for a reported fee of €500,000. He made his Ukrainian Premier League debut against Karpaty Lviv on 19 July, playing the full 90 minutes.

On 17 November 2012, he scored the only goal in a 1–0 victory over Dynamo Kyiv. He marked his 100th league appearance for Metalurh against Hoverla Uzhhorod on 20 April 2013, by scoring a winning goal for a 2–1 home win.

International career 
Dimitrov played for the league based national side in an unofficial friendly against Azerbaijan on 21 February 2002, scoring a goal for a 3–0 home win. He made his competitive debut for the national team in a 1–0 away loss against Spain on 20 November 2002, coming on as a second-half substitute. On 20 August 2003, Dimitrov opened his senior international goals tally, scoring twice for a 3–0 win over Lithuania.

He was included in the Bulgaria Euro 2004 squad in May 2004 by Plamen Markov and came on as a second-half substitute in Bulgaria's opening game against Sweden on 14 June. He was brought on once again in the match against Italy.

Career statistics

Club

International goals 
Scores and results list Bulgaria's goal tally first.

Honours

Club 
CSKA Sofia
 A PFG: 2002–03, 2004–05, 2007–08
 Bulgarian Cup: 2005–06
 Bulgarian Supercup: 2006

Metalurh Donetsk
 Ukrainian Cup: Runner-up 2009-10, 2011-12
 Ukrainian Super Cup: Runner-up 2012

References

External links

1979 births
Living people
Bulgarian footballers
Bulgarian expatriate footballers
Expatriate footballers in Ukraine
Bulgarian expatriate sportspeople in Ukraine
FC Lokomotiv 1929 Sofia players
PFC Minyor Pernik players
PFC Marek Dupnitsa players
PFC CSKA Sofia players
FC Metalurh Donetsk players
UEFA Euro 2004 players
First Professional Football League (Bulgaria) players
Ukrainian Premier League players
Bulgaria international footballers
Sportspeople from Pernik
Association football midfielders